Phaulernis rebeliella is a moth of the family Epermeniidae. It is found in France, Austria, Switzerland, Italy, Slovakia, Croatia and Slovenia.

References

Moths described in 1966
Epermeniidae
Moths of Europe